YMCA in Horsham was founded in 1898 by a group of young Christian men to provide sporting activities for young people in Horsham. The town at that point was short of facilities and YMCA provided recreational opportunities that included football, athletics, stallball, cricket, cycling, first aid, an overseas mission, libraries and Bible studies.

During the Second World War (1939–45) YMCA Horsham helped local people by providing care for Service personnel. This included the founding of a youth centre in North Street for young Canadians who were billeted in Horsham during the period.

Youth programmes continued until the sixties when the Boys Club opened in Hurst Road. YMCA chose to concentrate on their football programme at Horsham YMCA F.C. and to expand their operations into other social concerns that affected young people.

Current operations
During the 1990s the Horsham District Council area faced a problem in meeting government targets for providing accommodation for young people. YMCA at Guildford, a town about twenty-five miles from Horsham, provided an example of where YMCA had effectively worked with a local authority. The facilities in Guildford included a restaurant and conference facility with programmes for the disabled and the very young. There was accommodation for 132 residents and since the opening of the Guildford YMCA they had operated a summer camp scheme with over 500 young people taking part, organised personal development trips to India, opened a Youth Café and Advice Centre with a doctor and nurse available 3 sessions a week. 23 youth workers were employed in schools, the local church, café and helping disaffected young people. A proposal was made to YMCA in Horsham for a similar offer of services and programmes.

As a consequence of the alliance between YMCA led by a former CEO Alex Cloke and Horsham District Council, YMCA provides 48 single flats for young people and supports this by a qualified staff partly funded by the Horsham District council. The new building, known as 'The Y Centre' was constructed under a Design & Build Contract by Dean & Dyball Construction Limited with Hurley, Porte and Duell as project architects.

YMCA Horsham was merged into YMCA DownsLink Group in 2018 and is an independent autonomous charity, affiliated to the National Body, YMCA England & Wales.

Horsham